The Arsacid Dynasty was an Iranian royal dynasty that ruled Parthia, in modern-day Iran, from 247 BC to 224 AD.

Arsacid dynasty may also refer to:
Arsacid dynasty of Armenia (54–428), Armenia
Arsacid dynasty of Iberia (c. 189–284), Georgian Iberia
Arsacid dynasty of Caucasian Albania (1st–5th century), Caucasian Albania

See also
 List of rulers of Parthian sub-kingdoms